Fish doctor may refer to:

eelpout
fish medicine